Michael Hyatt (born 9 April 1970) is a Jamaican table tennis player. He competed  at the 1992 Summer Olympics and the 1996 Summer Olympics.

References

External links
 

1970 births
Living people
Jamaican male table tennis players
Olympic table tennis players of Jamaica
Table tennis players at the 1992 Summer Olympics
Table tennis players at the 1996 Summer Olympics
Place of birth missing (living people)